The 1930 All-Ireland Minor Hurling Championship was the third staging of the All-Ireland Minor Hurling Championship since its establishment by the Gaelic Athletic Association in 1928.

Waterford entered the championship as the defending champions, however, they were beaten by Tipperary in the Munster semi-final.

On 28 September 1930 Tipperary won the championship following a 4-1 to 2-1 defeat of Kilkenny in the All-Ireland final. This was their first All-Ireland title.

Results

Leinster Minor Hurling Championship

Final

Munster Minor Hurling Championship

Final

All-Ireland Minor Hurling Championship

Semi-final

Final

Statistics

Miscellaneous

 The Ulster Championship is contested for the first time.
 The All-Ireland final was played as a triple-header of games at Croke Park. The other two games were the All-Ireland junior hurling semi-final replay between Kilkenny and Tipperary and the All-Ireland football final between Kerry and Monaghan.

External links
 All-Ireland Minor Hurling Championship: Roll Of Honour

Minor
All-Ireland Minor Hurling Championship